Petr Zelenka (born February 27, 1976) is a Czech serial killer. He killed with a hidden vial of heparin — a blood-thinning drug causing internal bleeding when administered in large doses. Zelenka has already confessed and been taken into custody. His lawyer has been quoted as saying that Zelenka may have killed on an impulse to "test" doctors in Havlíčkův Brod, in the belief they were not good enough to discover the truth. In February 2008, Zelenka was convicted of killing seven patients and attempting to kill 10 others, and sentenced to life imprisonment.

See also
List of serial killers by country
List of serial killers by number of victims

References

1976 births
Czech people convicted of murder
Czech serial killers
Hospital scandals
Living people
Male nurses
Male serial killers
Medical controversies in the Czech Republic
Medical serial killers
Nurses convicted of killing patients
People convicted of murder by the Czech Republic
Poisoners